Joseph Sykes may refer to:

Joseph Sykes Brothers Company Building, a historic factory building located at Charlotte, Mecklenburg County, North Carolina.
Joseph Sykes Rymer, merchant and former Lord Mayors of York
Joseph Sykes, merchant of Hull, see Sykes family of Sledmere